Ninjin is the second original animated series from Cartoon Network Brazil (after Jorel's Brother), co-produced by Pocket Trap and Birdo Studio, based on the 2018 game Ninjin: Clash of Carrots.

The series was created by Pocket Trap and Roger Keesse, premiering on September 4, 2019 on Cartoon Network.

The official trailer was published on the Twitter platform on Cartoon Network Brazil's official account on September 2, 2019.

The first season consists of 22 episodes.

The first-season episodes are divided into three formats: 10 episodes with 1 minute, 7 episodes with 3 minutes and finally, the five-episode miniseries with 7 minutes.

The series was not renewed for a second season and was scrubbed from Cartoon Network Latin America's YouTube channels and HBO Max Latin America.

Characters 

 Ninjin (voiced by Carol Valença) is a male rabbit who wants to be a great ninja learning from Sensei, like your ancient ancestors. Has a large wooden sword with a broken tip as a weapon.
 Akai (voiced by Luiza Porto) is a female fox that befriended Ninjin the male rabbit and Flink, the male frog. She also wants to become a great kunoichi, meaning ninja girl, or the female version of the ninja, learning their arts with Sensei. Has purple bombs as the main weapon.
 Flink (voiced by Vii Zedek) is a male frog that has skills of levitation, telekinesis and control over the elements. He's friends with Ninjin  and Akai, he likes to eat carrot ramen
 Sensei (voiced by Alfredo Rollo) is an elderly rabbit that trains Ninjin, Akai and Flink to be great ninjas, despite not willingly teaching them.

Shogun Troop 

 General Jam (voiced by Marco França) is an deer that commands the Shogun Moe's army

Synopsis 
The series tells the story of a rabbit named Ninjin, a fox named Akai and a frog named Flink, go out in search of carrots stolen from their village by the evil mole Shogun Moe.

References 

Cartoon Network original programming
Animated series based on video games
Anime-influenced Western animated television series
Brazilian flash animated television series
Fictional rabbits and hares
Fictional ninja
Animated television series about rabbits and hares